Masjid al-Namirah is a mosque in Wadi Uranah near Mecca in the Makkah Province of Saudi Arabia. It is believed to be where the Islamic prophet Muhammad stayed before delivering his last sermon in Arafat. It is one of the most important landmarks during the Hajj, as it is where the khutbas are delivered to pilgrims during the Day of Arafah during the Dhuhr and Asr prayers. It is located near the Mount Arafat.

Structure 
The mosque was built somewhere in the 9th century AD during the Abbasid Caliphate. It saw its largest expansion under the Saudi regime, when it was expanded to 18,000 km2, holding over thousands of worshippers. It is the second largest mosque by area after the Masjid al-Haram. The expansions cost over 300 million riyals.

See also 
List of mosques in Saudi Arabia

References 

Hajj
Mosques in Saudi Arabia